Noël Mayaud (25 November 1899, Saumur - 2 May 1989, Saumur) was a French naturalist  who specialised in ornithology. He was, from 1929, on the editorial committee  of Alauda, Revue internationale d'Ornithologie :fr:Alauda, Revue internationale d'Ornithologie with its founder Paul Paris and Louis Lavauden, Henri Heim de Balsac, Jacques de Chavigny, Henri Jouard, Jacques Delamain and  Paul Poty.

References
René Ronsil (1948) .Bibliographie ornithologique française. Tome I. Bibliographie. Paul Lechevalier, Paris, 534 p.

French ornithologists
1989 deaths
1899 births
20th-century French zoologists